Sulphur Springs is an unincorporated community in Crawford County, Indiana, in the United States.

Sulphur Springs was named for the mineral spa it once contained.

References

Unincorporated communities in Crawford County, Indiana
Unincorporated communities in Indiana